2014 was the seventh competitive season for the Cairns based Sea Swift Northern Pride Rugby League Football Club. They played in the QRL state competition, the Intrust Super Cup. 13 clubs competed, with each club playing 24 matches (12 home and 12 away and 2 byes) over 26 weeks. In 2014 the Papua New Guinea Hunters were admitted to the competition and the Sunshine Coast Sea Eagles reverted to their original name, the Sunshine Coast Falcons.

2014 Season -  Sea Swift Northern Pride

Staff
 Coach: Jason Demetriou
 Assistant coaches: Ben Rauter and Joe O'Callaghan
 Team Co-Captains: Brett Anderson & Jason Roos 
 Club captain:
 Trainer: Deb Gallop
 Strength and conditioning Coach: Patrick Ranasinghe
 Physiotherapist: Tim Laycock
 Team manager: Rob White
 Chief executive: Brock Schaefer
 Chairman: Bob Fowler

 Competition: Intrust Super Cup

Player awards
 Sea Swift Most improved player - Sheldon Powe-Hobbs 
 Sea Swift Season Members Player of the Year - Sam Obst
 Sea Swift Best Back - Sam Obst
 Sea Swift Best Forward - Tyrone McCarthy
 Sea Swift Players' Player - Blake Leary
 Sea Swift Player of the Year - Ben Spina
 John O'Brien Club Person of the Year - Pat Bailey

2014 player gains
 Trent Barnard from CDRL Ivanhoes
 Pete Tognolini from CDRL Cairns Brothers and Pride Academy Under 18s
  Latu Fifita from North Sydney Bears
  Blake Leary from North Queensland Cowboys
  Jack Svendsen from North Queensland Cowboys NYC
  Tyrone McCarthy from Warrington Wolves
  Sheldon Powe Hobbs from Melbourne Storm NYC

Player losses after 2013 season
  Ty Williams retired to captain-coach CDRL Innisfail Leprachauns
  Ben Laity retired
  Aiden Smith resigned
  Hezron Murgha signed to the North Queensland Cowboys 
  Joel Riethmuller signed to the North Queensland Cowboys 
  Steve Snitch returned to the UK and played for Doncaster 
  Noel Underwood signed to NSW Cup Newcastle Knights 
  Nick Dorante signed to Queensland Cup Redcliffe Dolphins 
  Jordan Tighe signed to Queensland Cup Ipswich Jets

2014 Squad

 Jordan Biondi-Odo (Fullback)

 Brett Anderson (co-captain) (Centre)

 Davin Crampton (Centre)

 Semi Tadulala (Wing)

 Justin Castellaro (Wing)

 Shaun Nona (Five-eighth)

 Ryan Ghietti (Halfback)

 Sam Obst (Halfback)

 Lincoln Port

 Jared Allen

 Menmuny Murgha

 Alex Starmer (Prop)  

 Ben Spina (Prop)

 Jason Roos (co-captain) (Hooker)

 Blake Leary (Second Row)

 Tyrone McCarthy (Second Row)

 Sheldon Powe-Hobbs

 Jack Svendsen

 Latu Fifita

 Ben Jeffries

 Brent Oosen

 Tom Hancock

 Cameron King

 Ethan Lowe

 Hezron Murgha

 Javid Bowen

 Joel Riethmuller

 Kyle Feldt

 Lachlan Coote

 Matthew Wright

 Patrick Kafusi

 Ricky Thorby

 Ben Jeffries

 Brent Oosen

 Patrick Kaufusi  

 P J Webb 

Josh Mene

Aidan Smith

Keelan White

Jayden Gil

Taha Tutavake

Trey Kemp

Scott Bolton

Noel Underwood

2014 Season Launch
 Cairns Induction Day: Saturday 16 November 2013.
 Training for the 2014 season started on Monday 18 November 2013.
 2014 Season Launch =

Pre Season Boot Camp
 Lake Tinaroo, Atherton Tablelands - Friday 21-Sunday 23 February 2014.

2014 Jerseys

2014 Sponsors
Naming rights sponsor:
 Sea Swift
Jersey sponsor (back of jersey):
 Sea Swift 
 Brothers Leagues Club, Cairns
 Emu Sportswear
Sleeve sponsor:
 Skytrans
Finals Series sleeve sponsor:
 Rivers Insurance Brokers
Shorts sponsor:
 Brothers Leagues Club, Cairns
 Cairns Regional Council
 Fuller Sports
 Intrust Super
 Cairns Hardware
 EMU Sportswear.
Shirt manufacturer:
 EMU Sportswear.
Other sponsors: Castlemaine XXXX; Pacific Toyota; Cairns District Rugby League; Calanna Pharmacy; Tropic Wings; GATA Plastering; All Seasons Cairns Colonial Club; Cairns Plan Printing; Yalumba Winery.
Media partners: Sea FM; WIN Television; Cairns Post.

Trial Matches

Intrust Super Cup matches

2014 Ladder

Finals Series

NRL State Championship

2014 Northern Pride players

North Queensland Cowboys who played for the Northern Pride in 2014

2014 Televised Games

Channel Nine
In August 2012 as part of the historic $1 billion five-year broadcasting agreement with Nine and Fox Sports, the Australian Rugby League Commission confirmed that Intrust Super Cup matches would be televised by Channel 9 until 2018. One match a week is shown live across Queensland at 2.00pm (AEST) on Sunday afternoons on Channel 9 (or GEM), on WIN Television (RTQ) in regional areas and on Imparja Television in remote areas. The match is also broadcast in Papua New Guinea on Kundu 2 TV. The 2014 commentary team was Peter Psaltis, Scott Sattler and Mathew Thompson.
All home games, including one of the pre-season trial matches were streamed live through the Pride website.
 1: Northern Pride lost 26-29: Round 11, Sunday 11 May 2014 against Tweed Heads Seagulls 2.00pm from Piggabeen Sports Complex, Bailey St, Tweed Heads West.
 2: Northern Pride won 44-20: Round 16, Sunday 15 June 2014 against Easts Tigers 2.00pm from Langlands Park, Stones Corner, Brisbane.
 3: Northern Pride won 36-18: Round 18, Sunday, 29 June 2014 against Papua New Guinea Hunters 2.00 pm from Barlow Park, Cairns.
 4: Northern Pride won 22-18: Round 22, Sunday, 3 August 2014 against Tweed Heads Seagulls 12.30 pm (delayed telecast at 2.00 pm) from Barlow Park, Cairns.
 5: Northern Pride won Intrust Super Cup Grand Final 36-4: Sunday, 28 September 2014 against Easts Tigers 3.55 pm from Suncorp Stadium, Brisbane.
 6: Northern Pride won the inaugural NRL State Championship 32-28: Sunday, 5 October 2014 against Penrith Panthers 2.30 pm from ANZ Stadium, Sydney.

Live Streaming
From Round 1 2012 the Pride began live streaming their home games free to members via their website ($5 for non-members). From Round 5 2012 away games were streamed through the website as well (Free to members, $5 to non-members). In 2013, all matches (including pre-season trials but excluding matches broadcast live by Channel Nine) were streamed live through the Pride website, with access granted exclusively to Pride members. Video production was by Studio Productions and the commentary team was Adam Jackson and Northern Pride Under-18s coach, Cameron 'Spiller' Miller.

References

External links
 Northern Pride Official site
 Northern Pride Facebook Page
 Northern Pride Twitter Page
 Northern Pride YouTube Page
 2012 Northern Pride match highlights on YouTube

Northern Pride RLFC seasons
2014 in Australian rugby league
2014 in rugby league by club